Orhan "Riki" Cakić (born 17 June 1990 in Banja Luka) is a Bosnian-born Swedish footballer who plays for Assyriska IF as a midfielder.

References

External links

1990 births
Living people
Sportspeople from Banja Luka
Swedish people of Bosnia and Herzegovina descent
Bosnia and Herzegovina emigrants to Sweden
Association football midfielders
Bosnia and Herzegovina footballers
Swedish footballers
Sweden youth international footballers
IFK Norrköping players
Assyriska FF players
Ljungskile SK players
IK Sleipner players
IF Sylvia players
FC Linköping City players
Superettan players
Allsvenskan players